Alvin Wayne Casey (October 26, 1936 – September 17, 2006) was an American guitarist. He was mainly known for his work as a session musician, but also released his own records and scored three Billboard Hot 100 hits in the United States. His contribution to the rockabilly genre has been recognized by the Rockabilly Hall of Fame.

Early life 
Casey was born in Long Beach, California and moved to Phoenix, Arizona when he was two years old. His father played the guitar and tried to teach six-year-old Casey to play, but when he realized his son's fingers were too small, he gave him a ukulele instead. At the age of eight, Casey switched to the steel guitar and began taking formal music lessons. By the time he was 14, he was playing the steel guitar for various clubs in Phoenix, and in his later teens he performed five to six nights a week. When Casey was 20 he became serious about playing a traditional guitar.

Career

"The Fool" 
In his teens, Casey joined a local group, the Sunset Riders, and worked with vocalist Jody Reynolds. Around 1956, Casey crossed paths with Lee Hazlewood, a Coolidge, Arizona radio DJ who was looking for a singer to record his song, "The Fool". Casey suggested his schoolmate and friend Sanford Clark for the lead vocals. Casey played guitar for the recording and suggested a guitar riff which he had taken from Howlin' Wolf's song "Smokestack Lightnin". "The Fool" became a national hit and reached number No. 9 on the Billboard Top 10 pop charts. It also put the Phoenix music scene in the national spotlight. Due to the song's success, Casey went on a week long rockabilly tour with Carl Perkins, Gene Vincent, Eddie Cochran, Johnny Burnette, and Sonny James, traveling the country in Sanford Clark's Ford Mercury.

Duane Eddy and the Rebels 
In 1955, Casey met Duane Eddy and joined his band, Duane Eddy and the Rebels. For five years, Casey worked on and off with Eddy's band and performed for the Alan Freed and Dick Clark shows. Casey was also part of the backup for other Eddy recordings, playing bass, piano, and rhythm guitar. Casey wrote one of Eddy's earliest hits, "Ramrod" (1958), and when Eddy performed the song on American Bandstand he was flooded with requests for the single. "Ramrod" peaked at No. 27 on the Billboard Hot 100 and No. 17 on the Billboard R&B charts in 1958. Casey also co-wrote another Eddy hit, "Forty Miles of Bad Road", which peaked at No. 9 on Billboard's Hot 100 on July 27, 1959. In 1958 he also played guitar on Jody Reynolds's hit song "Endless Sleep".

Al Casey Combo 
In the early 1960s, Casey began working with his own ensemble, the Al Casey Combo. With this group he scored three instrumental hits: "Cookin" (U.S. No. 92, 1962), "Jivin' Around" (peaked at No. 71 on the Billboard Hot 100 and No. 22 on the Hot R&B/Hip Hop charts in 1962), and "Surfin' Hootenanny" (U.S. #48, 1963). The Surfin' Hootenanny album featured Casey mimicking the styles of Dick Dale, the Ventures, and Duane Eddy. Drummer Hal Blaine and organist Leon Russell played on many of these recordings; the backup vocal group, named the K-C-Ettes, were in fact the Blossoms. Casey recorded many of his albums with Stacy Records, which folded in 1964.

Studio session musician 
In 1958, The Arizona Republic noted that Casey performed on 95% of recording sessions held in Phoenix that year. In 1964, he gave up touring and began to play a variety of music styles for studio sessions. In 1965, Casey moved to Los Angeles and became part of the group of session musicians which became known as the Wrecking Crew. He worked with this group for 18 years playing a variety of music styles including jazz, country, rock, and pop. As a member of the Wrecking Crew, he worked for artists such as the Beach Boys, Phil Spector, Elvis Presley, Glen Campbell, the Association, the Monkees, Johnny Cash, Eddy Arnold, Simon & Garfunkel, the 5th Dimension, Harry Nilsson, the Partridge Family, Frank Sinatra, and Nancy Sinatra. During this time, Casey also worked for three years as a member of the band on The Dean Martin Show.

Guitar teacher and music store owner 
In the late 1960s, Casey owned a music store in Hollywood called Al Casey's Music Room.

On August 3, 1967, George Harrison went with Neil Aspinall to Western recorders studio to gate crash a session with Lou Adler and John Philips. Mike Deasy, one of the session players, was playing a prototype Bartell Fretless Guitar that Harrison was very interested in. Aspinall immediately ordered one of the new 'Secret' guitars from Al Casey. It was Casey's wife Maxine who delivered the Bartell to Harrison on Blue Jay Way. A couple of weeks later Casey took out an advertisement in the Los Angeles Free Press saying, "George Harrison got the first guitar, maybe if you hurry you can get the second one!" The Bartell became one of the rarest Beatles guitars and was played by both John Lennon and George Harrison on The Beatles' White Album — it sold in 2020 for $300,000.

In 1968, Casey loaned his red Hagström Viking II guitar to Elvis Presley for his '68 Comeback Special.

In 1983, Casey moved back to Phoenix where he taught guitar lessons at Ziggie's Music and performed for occasional shows.

Later recordings and legacy 
Casey continued recording into the 1990s, including an LP release, Sidewinder, for Bear Family Records. In 2001, he played guitar, dobro, mandolin, and banjo on Al Beasley's A Rainbow in the Clouds album, recorded live at the Kerr Cultural Center in Scottsdale, Arizona. He was a featured guitarist on the Exotic Guitars series of albums on the Ranwood Records label.

In 2005, Casey was inducted into the Arizona Music Hall of Fame. He was also inducted into the Rockabilly Hall of Fame.

Casey died on September 17, 2006, in Phoenix, Arizona.

In 2008, Casey, along with many of his fellow studio musicians, was featured in the documentary film The Wrecking Crew.

Independent Record label, Fervor Records, has placed many of his recordings in TV and film.

Discography
{| class="wikitable"
|+
|
|
|
|
|
|
|-
| rowspan="25" |Al Casey
|Nola b/w Shine on Harvest Moon
|
|Old Timer Records
|S8151
|1955
|-
|If I Told You (Wouldn't Know It All By Myself) b/w The Pink Panther
|
|MCI
|45-1004
|1956
|-
|Guitar Man b/w Come What May
|
|Dot Records
|45-15563
|1957
|-
|(Got The) Teen-Age Blues b/w The Adventures of Frank N. Stein
(Record Label Shown as Al Casey and the Bats)
|
|Highland
|M-2033
|1958
|-
| rowspan="11" |Surfin' Hootenanny
|LP, Album, Mono
|Barry
|B-319 (C)
| rowspan="7" |1963
|-
|LP
|Stacy Records
|STM 100-1
|-
|LP, Mono
|Stacy Records
|STM 100-1
|-
|LP, Album
|Troubadour
|TRL E 1232
|-
|7"
|Discostar
|1066
|-
|7"
|CNR
|A 9028
|-
|7", Single
|CBS
|1237
|-
|LP, Album, RE, Unofficial, Pac, Mono
|Stacy Records
|STS-100
|Unknown
|-
|CD, Album
|Sundazed Music
|SC 6114
| rowspan="2" |1996
|-
|LP, Album, RE, Red, Gre
|Sundazed Music
|LP 5026
|-
|LP, Album, Gre, Mono
|Sundazed Music
|LP 5531
|2016
|-
|Surfin' Hootenanny/Easy Pickin'/ Doin' It/ Monte Carlo
|7", EP
|Philips
|434818 BE
|1963
|-
|Sidewinder
|CD, Album
|Bear Family Records
|BCD 15889 AH
|1995
|-
|Juice/A Fool's Blues
|7"
|Dot Records
|45 15524
|1956
|-
|Willa Mae/She's Gotta Shake
|7", Single
|Liberty
|F-55117
|1957
|-
|Come What May
|7"
|Dot Records
|45-15563
|1957
|-
|The Stinger/Keep Talking
|7", Single, Promo
|United Artists Records
|UA 158
|1959
|-
|Guitars, Guitars, Guitars/The Hearse
|7", Single
|CBS
|1304
|Unknown
|-
|Jivin' Around
|CD, Comp
|Ace
|CDCHD 612
|1995
|-
|Surfin' Hootenanny
|CD, Comp, RE
|Stacy Records
|STS 100
|1995
|-
|A Man For All Sessions
|CD, Comp
|Bear Family Records
|BCD16579 AH
|2001
|-
!Artist
!Album
!Format
!Record Label
!CAT#
!Release Date
|-
| rowspan="7" |Al Casey Combo
| rowspan="2" |Jivin' Around/Doin' the Shotish
|7', Single
|Barry
|B-3124X
| rowspan="2" |1962
|-
|7"
|Stacy Records
|936
|-
|Cookin'/Hotfoot
|7", Single
|Stacy Records
|925 X
|1962
|-
|Cookin|7", Single
|Barry
|B-3109X
|1962
|-
|Laughin'/ Chicken Feathers
|7", Single, Promo
|Stacy Records
|950
|1962
|-
|Doin' It/ Monte Carlo
|7", Single, Promo
|Stacy Records
|956
|1963
|-
|Indian Love Call/Full House
|7", Single
|Stacy Records
|961
|1963
|-
| rowspan="9" |Al Casey with the K-C Ettes
| rowspan="2" |Guitars, Guitars, Guitars/Surfin' Blues (Part 1)
|7", Single, Promo
|Stacy Records
|964
|1963
|-
|7", Single
|Barry
|B-3218X
|1963
|-
| rowspan="7" |Surfin' Hootenanny/Easy Pickin'''
|7"
|Discostar
|1066
|1963
|-
|7"
|CNR
|A 9028
|1963
|-
|7", Single
|CBS
|1237
|1963
|-
|7", Single, Red, Promo
|Stacy Records
|962
|1963
|-
|7", Single
|Barry
|B-3196X
|1963
|-
|7", Single
|W&G
|WG-S-1645
|1963
|-
|7", Single
|Pye International
|7N.25215
|1963
|-
|Al Casey With the K-C Elites/Al Casey Combo
|What Are We Gonna Do in '64?/Cookin
|7", Single
|Stacy Records
|971
|1964
|-
|Chet Baker (with Al Casey)
|Blood, Chet, and Tears|
|Verve Records
|
|1970
|-
|Duane Eddy and His Rockabillies Featuring Al Casey
|The Ford Single|7"
|Sleazy Records
|SR52
|2013
|-
|Don Cole, Al Casey
|Snake-Eyed Mama/Kiss of Love|7", Single
|RPM Records
|45x502
|Unknown
|-
|Lee Hazlewood & Al Casey Combo
|Farmisht, Flatulence, Origami, ARF!! And Me|CD, Album
|Smells Like Records
|SLR 031
|1999
|-
|Various
|Almost Big Hits of 1962, Vol. 8 (Original Recordings)|
|Six Week Smile
|
|2013
|-
|Various
|Mid-Century Sounds: Deep Cuts From the Desert (Vol. 1)
|CD, Vinyl, LP, Whi + LP, Comp, Bla
|Fervor Records
|FVRLP001
|2017
|-
|Various
|Amazing Hits of the Transistor Era Vol. 1|12xFile, MP3, Album. 256 kbps
|Fervor Records
|
|2007
|-
|Various
|Amazing Hits of the Transistor Era Vol. 2|13xFile, MP3, Compilation, 256 kbps
|Fervor Records
|
|2007
|}

 Collaborations 
With Glen Campbell
 Burning Bridges (Capitol Records, 1967)
 Wichita Lineman (Capitol Records, 1968)
 Hey Little One (Capitol Records, 1968)
 A New Place in the Sun (Capitol Records, 1968)
 Galveston (Capitol Records, 1969)
 Try a Little Kindness (Capitol Records, 1970)
 The Glen Campbell Goodtime Album (Capitol Records, 1971)
 I Knew Jesus (Before He Was a Star) (Capitol Records, 1973)

With Jennifer Warnes
 I Can Remember Everything (Parrot Records, 1967)

With Nancy Sinatra
 Sugar (Reprise Records, 1966)
 Nancy (Reprise Records, 1969)

With Michael Nesmith
 Nevada Fighter (RCA Records, 1971)

With Delaney & Bonnie
 Genesis (GNP, 1971)

With Bobby Darin
 If I Were a Carpenter'' (Atlantic Records, 1966)

Tv and Film

References

External links

1936 births
2006 deaths
American rock guitarists
American male guitarists
Guitarists from Arizona
Musicians from Long Beach, California
American session musicians
Challenge Records artists
Liberty Records artists
The Wrecking Crew (music) members
20th-century American guitarists
Guitarists from California
20th-century American male musicians